Ray Nitschke Field is one of the two outdoor practice facilities of the Green Bay Packers (the other is Clarke Hinkle Field). These fields, together with the Don Hutson Center, comprise the team's training complex.

The field is named for Ray Nitschke, who played for the Packers from 1958 to 1972 and whose number 66 was retired by the team.  Nitschke is a member of both the Pro Football and Packers Hall of Fames.

On June 18, 2003, the Brown County Board voted 23–0 to approve a new lease for Ray Nitschke Field which gave the Packers the use of the site through 2020. The lease began in 2004 and started at $125,000 with an increase of $5,000 in each succeeding year. The Packers had been leasing the field from the County since 1997 for $15,000 a year. This field had an artificial FieldTurf surface, installed in 2004 (Clarke Hinkle Field has a natural grass surface).

The Packers have since signed a 15-year lease with Brown County to move the field closer to the Don Hutson Center, with their paying $200,000 to the county this year and increasing $6,500 each subsequent year. The new location is in a former parking lot for the Resch Center and as part of the deal the Packers had to build a 205-space parking lot at the former site of Nitschke Field.

On August 1, 2009, the Packers unveiled major renovations to the practice facility, including bleacher seating for 1500 fans, a sound system for announcements and music as well as natural grass field with underground heating. The heating system will enable the team to host outdoor practices in the winter, something they have been unable to do in the past. The exterior facade uses the same brick style as Lambeau Field and the 170 × 75-yard field is considered a state-of-the-art practice field unlike anything else in the NFL.

References

External links
 article on new Nitschke Field lease
 Milwaukee Journal Sentinel article about the installation of the FieldTurf surface

Green Bay Packers stadiums
Sports venues in Green Bay, Wisconsin
American football venues in Wisconsin
1997 establishments in Wisconsin
Sports venues completed in 1997